Mimosa scabrella is a tree in the family Fabaceae. It has yellow flowers.

Biology
Mimosa scabrella (Bracatinga) is a tree in the subfamily Mimosoideae of the family Fabaceae. It is a cross-pollinating, mostly tetraploid plant with 52 chromosomes.

Mimosa scabrella is native to the southern region of Brazil. There it grows naturally in associations called “Bracatingais”. The Cerrado zone is a centre of biodiversity of Mimosa, where about one quarter of all Mimosa species are found. However M. scabrella evolved to grow in colder humid weather south from this region, in a sub-type of Atlantic Forest, called "mixed ombrophilous forest" (also known as Araucaria moist forests).

It is one of the fastest growing trees in the world.

Characterization
The leaves are bi-pinnate. Each leaf has several pinna, which again have 15–31 pairs of pinnules. The upper side of the leaves is yellow-green coloured with a paler underneath.

The flowers with ovary, narrow and slender pistils are ordered in clusters of 1–3 at the leaf bases. They are colored in a whitish to yellow color. They are covered with tiny warts and separated into 2–4 segments. Each segment is 4-angeled and 1-seeded. The dominant reproductive system is an allogamy (cross-pollinating) system. The reproductive age of M. scabrella is reached after around 3 years.

Uses
Because of the abundant flowering and presence of honeydew caused by Cochineal infestation in some altitudes the tree has an important place in honey production, especially in Brazil. Its wood is suitable for firewood and can also be used as lumber. Before the advent of the diesel locomotive, M. scabrella wood was grown to fuel railroads in parts of Brazil. The long fibres are used for paper production. 

In agroforestry M. scabrella shades coffee plants. It is also used in intercropping systems in association with maize and beans. Because M. scabrella is a legume tree it doesn't need fertilization and with the decomposition of the leaves, big amounts of nitrogen become available for other plants.
Because M. scabrella has beautiful “feather” leaves, it is often used as an ornamental tree or live fence.

Because of its fast growth its often used for reforestation management.

Alkaloids
Mimosa scabrella contains the alkaloids tryptamine, N-methyltryptamine, N,N-dimethyltryptamine and N-methyltetrahydrocarboline in its bark.

Cultivation
The soil should be well drained. Acid soils with pH as low as 4.8 and soils with high aluminum content are tolerated. Waterlogged, compacted or severely degraded soils are not suitable for M. scabrella. Dry periods of up to four months can be tolerated. Mimosa scabrella is susceptible to strong winds.

Although M. scabrella is native to Brazil, it is cultivated in many South American, some African and South European countries. In its native range, some 28 species of insects are reported to attack M. scabrella.

See also
Psychedelic plants
Reforestation

References

External links

Mimosa scabrella (www.worldagroforestry.org)
Mimosa scabrella (Purdue University)
Mimosa scabrella (www.winrock.org)

scabrella
Flora of the Atlantic Forest
Flora of Brazil
Flora of Misiones Province